The 1940–41 OB I bajnokság season was the fifth season of the OB I bajnokság, the top level of ice hockey in Hungary. Teams first participated in regional groups. Three teams participated in the final round, and BBTE Budapest won the championship.

First round

Budapest Group

North Group
Won by Kassai AC.

Székelyföld Group

Kolozsvár Group 
Won by Kolozsvári KE.

Final round

External links
 Season on hockeyarchives.info

Hun
OB I bajnoksag seasons
1940–41 in Hungarian ice hockey